Olga Grigoryevna Shatunovskaya (1 March 1901, Baku – 23 November 1990, Moscow) was a prominent Old Bolshevik who played an important role in the implementation of de-Stalinization in the Soviet Union. A survivor of the Gulag, she was a member of Shvernik Commission created by Nikita Khrushchev to investigate the crimes of Joseph Stalin.

Shatunovskaya became a member of the Communist Party when she was 16. A close associate of Anastas Mikoyan, she worked in the party's Baku organization since 1918 under the leadership of Stepan Shaumian. During the 1930-1950s, she was a political prisoner of the Stalinist regime. After the death of Stalin, she became a member of the Soviet Party Control Committee, and head of a special commission on rehabilitations during the Khrushchev Thaw. She was the chief-investigator of the Kirov murder. Shatunovskaya was honored with the highest Soviet medals.

Her memoirs, recorded by her children and grandchildren, were turned into a book by philosopher and essayist Grigory Pomerants under the title Sledstvie vedet katorzhanka [Investigation led by convict], published in 2004.

References

Further reading

External links
Biography of Shatunovskaya (in Russian)
Khrushchev Era Politics and the Investigation of the Kirov Murder, 1956-1957

1901 births
1990 deaths
Russian communists